The DART 280 is a four-seat light-single piston-engined helicopter concept by Austrian Diamond Aircraft.

Development

Launched at the April 2017 AERO Friedrichshafen, its first flight was scheduled for October 2018 and certification a year later.
Its development was later put on hold until it has a viable market.

Design 
Intended to compete with the Robinson R44, the composite aircraft will have a 280shp (208kW) four-stroke jet-fuel engine, energy absorbing retractable landing gear and a shrouded electric tail rotor.
The  MTOW helicopter could haul a  payload, cruising at  while burning  of fuel per hour.

Specifications

See also

References

External links
 Diamond Aircraft Industries

Dart 280
2010s Austrian helicopters
Single-engined piston helicopters
Proposed aircraft of Austria